Alla Borisovna Pokrovskaya (18 September 1937 – 25 June 2019) was a Soviet-Russian actress and educator.

Life
Pokrovskaya was born in Moscow her father was the opera director Boris Pokrovsky and her mother,  was the director of the Central Children's Theatre. Her parents' did not encourage or rate her acting talents. She initially decided to be a teacher but then went into acting. She studied at the Moscow Art Theater School and in her spare time she volunteered as a stage hand for Oleg Efremov's theatre. Whilst there where she saw Igor Kvasha, Galina Volchek and Yevgeny Yevstigneyev  perform at the Sovremennik Theatre. She graduated in 1959.

Pokrovskaya was a professor at the Moscow Art Theatre School. She was married to actor Oleg Yefremov. Pokrovskaya was known for her roles in Take Aim, Fox Hunting and July Rain,

One of her last films was  Vysotsky. Thank You For Being Alive  where she appeared as Vladimir Vysotsky's mother.

Pokrovskaya died on 25 June 2019 at a Moscow hospital due to sepsis caused by liver disease, aged 81.

Filmography

References

External links 
 

1937 births
2019 deaths
Deaths from liver disease
Deaths from sepsis
Russian educators
Russian film actresses
Soviet film actresses
Russian television actresses
Soviet television actresses
Actresses from Moscow
People's Artists of the RSFSR
Recipients of the Order of Honour (Russia)
Honored Artists of the RSFSR
Russian stage actresses
Soviet stage actresses
Moscow Art Theatre School alumni
Academic staff of Moscow Art Theatre School
Burials in Troyekurovskoye Cemetery
20th-century Russian women